Xhersild Haka (born 8 November 2000) is an Albanian footballer who plays as a right defender for Elbasani in the Kategoria e Parë.

Career

Kastrioti
Haka began his senior career with Kastrioti, breaking into the first team in early 2020. He made his debut for the club on 29 January 2020, coming on as a 60th-minute substitute for Spartak Ajazi in a 3–1 defeat to Tirana in the Albanian Cup. He would make just five league appearances before leaving the club on a free transfer.

Elbasani
In October 2020, Haka moved to Elbasani. He made his debut for the club on 4 November 2020 in a 3–0 defeat to Egnatia.

Career statistics

Club

References

External links
Xhersild Haka at Sofa Score

2000 births
Living people
KS Kastrioti players
KF Elbasani players
Kategoria e Parë players
Albanian footballers
Association football midfielders